Otto Tange (22 September 1915 – 30 July 1943) was a Luftwaffe ace and recipient of the Knight's Cross of the Iron Cross during World War II. Tange claimed 68 aerial victories, 3 over the Western Front and 65 over the Eastern Front. The Knight's Cross of the Iron Cross was awarded to recognise extreme battlefield bravery or successful military leadership.

Career
Otto Tange was a member of the Luftwaffe at the beginning of the war and participated in the Battle of France and the Battle of Britain. During the Battle of Britain he claimed his first three victories.  Tange then participated in Operation Barbarossa, by the end of 1941 he claimed 33 more victories.  On 19 March 1942 Otto Tange was awarded the Knight's Cross of the Iron Cross for having 40 victories. Tange was killed by anti-aircraft fire on 30 July 1943. At the time of his death, his total was 68 victories.

Awards
 Flugzeugführerabzeichen
 Ehrenpokal der Luftwaffe (1 September 1941)
 Front Flying Clasp of the Luftwaffe
 Iron Cross (1939)
 2nd Class
 1st Class
 German Cross in Gold on 24 November 1941 as Feldwebel in the 5./Jagdgeschwader 51
 Knight's Cross of the Iron Cross on 19 March 1942 as Oberfeldwebel and pilot in the  4./Jagdgeschwader 51 "Mölders"

References

Citations

Bibliography

 
 
 
 

1915 births
1943 deaths
People from Dithmarschen
People from the Province of Schleswig-Holstein
Luftwaffe pilots
German World War II flying aces
Recipients of the Gold German Cross
Recipients of the Knight's Cross of the Iron Cross
Luftwaffe personnel killed in World War II
Military personnel from Schleswig-Holstein
Aviators killed by being shot down